Amauropelta dodsonii, synonym Thelypteris dodsonii, is a species of fern in the family Thelypteridaceae. It is endemic to Ecuador. Its natural habitats are subtropical or tropical moist lowland forests and subtropical or tropical moist montane forests. It is threatened by habitat loss.

References

Thelypteridaceae
Endemic flora of Ecuador
Vulnerable flora of South America
Taxonomy articles created by Polbot
Taxobox binomials not recognized by IUCN